Axel Jöhncke (16 January 1878 – 29 September 1953) was a Swedish fencer. He competed in the individual foil and team sabre events at the 1912 Summer Olympics.

References

External links
 

1878 births
1953 deaths
Swedish male foil fencers
Swedish male sabre fencers
Olympic fencers of Sweden
Fencers at the 1912 Summer Olympics
Sportspeople from Copenhagen
20th-century Swedish people
Danish emigrants to Sweden